Qismat Ka Likha previously titled Qismat is a 2019 Pakistani family drama television series produced by Aijaz Aslam under Ice Media and Entertainment. It aired every Monday on Express Entertainment.

Cast
Zhalay Sarhadi as Mehreen
Aijaz Aslam as Obaid
Jinaan Hussain as Laiba
Rubina Arif as Suriya	
Laila Wasti as Aisha
Sabahat Ali Bukhari as Nafisa (Aisha's mother)
Fahima Awan as Shaista
Jinaan Hussain as Zari
Maryam Tiwana as Hiba
Faraz Farooqui as Hadi
Zulqarnain Haider

References

2019 Pakistani television series debuts
Pakistani drama television series
Urdu-language television shows
Pakistani television series